Terri Russell (born 3 June 1954 in Kalgoorlie, Western Australia) is a former Australian cricket player. Russell played thirteen one day internationals for the Australia national women's cricket team. Her final WODI appearance was in the final of the 1982 Women's Cricket World Cup.

References

External links
 Terri Russell at CricketArchive
 Terri Russell at southernstars.org.au

Living people
1954 births
People from Kalgoorlie
Australia women One Day International cricketers
Western Australia women cricketers